William Dalby (January 28, 1839 – January 22, 1916) was a merchant, real estate agent, insurance agent, and a political figure in British Columbia, Canada.

Biography 
He was born in Richmond Hill, Upper Canada and came to Victoria with John Grant in 1862. Dalby established a tannery and manufacturing business there. He was a justice of the peace and president of the Agricultural Association. Dalby was a Grand Master in the Masonic lodge of British Columbia. He was married twice: to Sarah Jane Robinson Moody, the sister of Sewell Moody, in 1866 and to Susan Netherby in 1889. He died at home in Victoria at the age of 76.

Political history 
He was mayor of Victoria, British Columbia from April 15, 1873 when he was selected to replace mayor James D. Robinson to 1875. Dalby was also an unsuccessful candidate for a seat in the provincial legislature in 1871 and in 1890.

References

Mayors of Victoria, British Columbia
1839 births
1916 deaths
Canadian justices of the peace